University Mobility in Asia and the Pacific (UMAP) has developed a pilot UMAP Credit Transfer Scheme (UCTS) to facilitate greater student mobility in the region by providing a framework for establishing credit transfer arrangements. UCTS model adopted the European Credit Transfer and Accumulation System (ECTS) in order to assist and facilitate the student mobility and create a flexible mean of transferring grades between participating universities, countries/territories and governments.

Objective
The UCTS objective is to ensure effective credit transfer for students undertaking exchange program in universities from UMAP countries/territories and other regions.

UCTS Components
Some of the major components of the UCTS scheme are:
Staff in home and host universities needs to negotiate and oversee student program
UCTS credit point scale will be used as a conversion scale to record the student workload in home and host institution

Home University Responsibilities
Negotiation of the study program in the host university
Record the approved study program
Arrange the level of financial support
Convert UCTS credit points to home university equivalents

Host University Responsibilities
Negotiation of the study program with the university
Authorize the approved study program
Enter the host university credits/grades, and convert them to UCTS credit points
Ensure that the registrar (or delegate) provides official certification of the Transcript

UCTS Credit Points
UCTS credit points are numerical values (1 to 60) and it is allocated to course units to measure student workload required to finish the course. 60 credit points represent full-time student workload for a full academic year. For one semester exchange student, the credit points would be represented with 30 credit points.

Example: One Semester Study Program in Host University (Host University = 16 Credit point per semester; Home University = 6 credit points per term)

Conversion from Host University Credit Points to UCTS: 4*30/16

Conversion from UCTS to Home University Credit Points: 7.5*9/30

Converting Credit Points
Credit points measures student workload, however this does not represent the achievements
Credit Points should only be awarded to those who successfully completed the requirements of a course unit
The calculation should be made in terms of minimum and not average

UCTS Grading Scale
The UCTS credit points scale and grading scale are not intended to replace host and home universities scales. It is used solely for the purpose of assisting the conversion. 

 

The grading scale of universities will vary between countries/territories within UMAP. As in European Credit Transfer and Accumulation System (ECTS), it is necessary to have a common scale for conversion purposes.

See also
European Credit Transfer and Accumulation System
ECTS grading scale

References 

Academic transfer
Student exchange